The colonial secretary of New Zealand was an office established in 1840 and abolished in 1907. The office was similar to colonial secretaries found elsewhere in the British Empire.

Along with the chief justice, the office was one of the first four created by Governor William Hobson when he arrived in New Zealand in January 1840. The Colonial Secretary's Office handled the creation of New Zealand's public service, and became the modern Department of Internal Affairs in 1907. The colonial secretary became known as the minister of internal affairs from then on.

Constitutionally, the colonial secretary was considered the deputy of the governor, until the granting of responsible government. The colonial secretary was to serve as administrator of the government upon the vacancy of the office of governor-general; Willoughby Shortland acted as administrator following the death of William Hobson in 1841. Henry Sewell, who is considered by some as the first premier (or prime minister), held the position for his short tenure as head of the government in 1856.

List of Colonial Secretaries

Notes

References

Constitution of New Zealand
Colonial Secretary
Colonial Secretary
1840 establishments in New Zealand
Lists of political office-holders in New Zealand